Tvoje lice zvuči poznato 2 is the second season of the Serbian reality competition Tvoje lice zvuči poznato, based on Your Face Sounds Familiar. It started airing on October 12, 2014 and ended on December 28. The previous season's judges, TV presenter Ivan Ivanović and vocalist Marija Mihajlović, returned for another series, whilst actress Katarina Radivojević was replaced with comedian and actor Branko Đurić. Marija Kilibarda co-hosted the show again, this time with actor Bojan Ivković. The series was won by singer Branislav Mojićević.

Format
The show challenges celebrities (singers and actors) to perform as different iconic music artists every week, which are chosen by the show's "Randomiser". They are then judged by the panel of celebrity judges including Ivan Ivanović, Branko Đurić Đura and Marija Mihajlović. Each week, one celebrity guest judge joins Ivan, Branko and Marija to make up the complete judging panel. Marija Mihajlović is also a voice coach. Each celebrity gets transformed into a different singer each week, and performs an iconic song and dance routine well known by that particular singer. The 'randomiser' can choose any older or younger artist available in the machine, or even a singer of the opposite sex, or a deceased singer. Winner of each episode wins €1000, and winner of whole show wins €25000. All money goes to charity of winner's own choice. The show lasts 12 weeks.

Voting
The contestants are awarded points from the judges (and each other) based on their singing, Acting and dance routines. Judges give points from 2 to 12, with the exception of 11. After that, each contestant gives 5 points to a fellow contestant of their choice (known as "Bonus" points). In week 11 (semi-final week) and in week 12 (final week), viewers also vote via text messages. In week 11 (semi-final), all judges points from past weeks and from semi-final are made into points from 2 to 12 (without 11). Contestants with most judges points will get 12 points, second placed will get 10, third placed 9 and 10th placed will get only 2 points. After that, public votes will also be made into points from 2 to 12, again with the exception of 11. Contestant with most public votes will get 12 points, second placed 10 and 10th placed will get only 2. All those points will be summed up and five contestants with most points will go to final week. In final week, judges will not vote - contestant with most public vote will win the show.

Contestants

Series overview

Week 1 (October 12)
Guest Judge: Ana Kokić 
Winner: Neda Ukraden

Bonus points
 Jelena Gavrilović gave five points to Katarina Bogićević
 Neda Ukraden gave five points to Ivan Jevtović
 Tanja Savić gave five points to Branislav Mojićević
 Dragan Kojić Keba gave five points to Jelena Gavrilović
 Nenad Okanović gave five points to Ivan Jevtović
 Elena Risteska gave five points to Katarina Bogićević
 Zvonko Pantović gave five points to Jelena Gavrilović
 Branislav Mojićević gave five points to Tanja Savić
 Katarina Bogićević gave five points to Neda Ukraden
 Ivan Jevtović gave five points to Neda Ukraden

Week 2 (October 19)
Guest Judge: Milan Lane Gutović 
Winner: Katarina Bogićević

Bonus points
 Elena Risteska gave five points to Branislav Mojićević
 Branislav Mojićević gave five points to Katarina Bogićević
 Katarina Bogićević gave five points to Nenad Okanović
 Neda Ukraden gave five points to Jelena Gavrilović
 Jelena Gavrilović gave five points to Neda Ukraden
 Ivan Jevtović gave five points to Katarina Bogićević
 Tanja Savić gave five points to Branislav Mojićević
 Dragan Kojić Keba gave five points to Ivan Jevtović
 Nenad Okanović gave five points to Katarina Bogićević
 Zvonko Pantović gave five points to Katarina Bogićević

Week 3 (October 26)
Guest Judge: Slađana Milošević
Winner:  Dragan Kojić Keba

Bonus points
 Jelena Gavrilović gave five points to Elena Risteska
 Neda Ukraden gave five points to Keba
 Keba gave five points to Čipi
 Nenad Okanović gave five points to Elena Risteska
 Čipi gave five points to Ivan Jevtović
 Katarina Bogićević gave five points to Jelena Gavrilović
 Ivan Jevtović gave five points to Čipi
 Branislav Mojićević gave five points to Elena Risteska
 Elena Risteska gave five points to Keba
 Tanja Savić gave five points to Keba

Week 4 (November 2)
Guest Judge: Tonči Huljić 
Winner: Nenad Okanović

Bonus points
 Elena Risteska gave five points to Jelena Gavrilović
 Branislav Mojićević gave five points to Nenad Okanović
 Katarina Bogićević gave five points to Ivan Jevtović
 Ivan Jevtović gave five points to Nenad Okanović
 Neda Ukraden gave five points to Tanja Savić
 Čipi gave five points to Nenad Okanović
 Keba gave five points to Nenad Okanović
 Jelena Gavrilović gave five points to Nenad Okanović
 Tanja Savić gave five points to Katraina Bogićević
 Nenad Okanović gave five points to Čipi

Week 5 (November 9)
Guest Judge: Marko Janjić and Tanja Bošković
Winner: Elena Risteska

Bonus points
 Neda Ukraden gave five points to Elena Risteska
 Branislav Mojićević gave five points to Čipi
 Jelena Gavrilović gave five points to Ivan Jevtović
 Katarina Bogićević gave five points to Elena Risteska
 Tanja Savić gave five points to Ivan Jevtović
 Keba  gave five points to Elena Risteska
 Nenad Okanović gave five points to Katarina Bogićević
 Čipi gave five points to Elena Risteska
 Elena Risteska gave five points to Neda Ukraden
 Ivan Jevtović gave five points to Branislav Mojićević

Week 6 (November 16)
Guest Judge: Niggor
Winner: Branislav Mojićević

Bonus points
 Neda Ukraden gave five points to Branislav Mojićević
 Tanja Savić gave five points to Neda Ukraden
 Katarina Bogićević gave five points to Branislav Mojićević
 Zvonko Pantović gave five points to Branislav Mojićević
 Elena Risteska gave five points to Ivan Jevtović
 Branislav Mojićević gave five points to Ivan Jevtović
 Ivan Jevtović gave five points to Jelena Gavrilović
 Nenad Okanović gave five points to Branislav Mojićević
 Jelena Gavrilović gave five points to Branislav Mojićević
 Dragan Kojić Keba gave five points to Branislav Mojićević

Week 7 (November 23)
Guest Judge: Željko Joksimović
Winner: Zvonko Pantović Čipi

Bonus points
 Katarina Bogićević gave five points to Zvonko Pantović Čipi
 Nenad Okanović gave five points to Zvonko Pantović Čipi
 Elena Risteska gave five points to Zvonko Pantović Čipi
 Ivan Jevtović gave five points to Tanja Savić
 Tanja Savić gave five points to Zvonko Pantović Čipi
 Neda Ukraden gave five points to Tanja Savić
 Dragan Kojić Keba gave five points to Tanja Savić
 Zvonko Pantović gave five points to Tanja Savić
 Jelena Gavrilović gave five points to Zvonko Pantović Čipi
 Branislav Mojićević gave five points to Zvonko Pantović Čipi

Week 8 (November 30)
Guest Judge: Ivan Bosiljčić
Winner: Jelena Gavrilović

Bonus points
 Tanja Savić gave five points to Jelena Gavrilović
 Branislav Mojićević gave five points to Jelena Gavrilović
 Ivan Jevtović gave five points to Elena Risteska
 Katarina Bogićević gave five points to Jelena Gavrilović
 Dragan Kojić Keba gave five points to Neda Ukraden
 Jelena Gavrilović gave five points to Dragan Kojić Keba
 Zvonko Pantović gave five points to Neda Ukraden
 Neda Ukraden gave five points to Jelena Gavrilović
 Elena Risteska gave five points to Jelena Gavrilović
 Nenad Okanović gave five points to Ivan Jevtović

Week 9 (December 7)
Guest Judge: Kaliopi
Winner: Tanja SavićBonus points
 All the contestants gave five points to Tanja Savić, while Tanja Savić gave five points to Elena Risteska.

Week 10 (December 14)Guest Judge: Danica MaksimovićWinner: Ivan Jevtović

Bonus points
 Katarina Bogićević gave five points to Ivan Jevtović Nenad Okanović gave five points to Ivan Jevtović Branislav Mojićević gave five points to Jelena Gavrilović Jelena Gavrilović gave five points to Elena Risteska Neda Ukraden Keba gave five points to Ivan Jevtović Ivan Jevtović gave five points to Zvonko Pantović Zvonko Pantović gave five points to Ivan Jevtović Elena Risteska gave five points to Nenad Okanović Tanja Savić gave five points to Dragan Kojić Keba Dragan Kojić Keba gave five points to Tanja Savić Semi-final (December 21)Guest Judge: Konstantin Kostjukov   Winner: Katarina Bogićević

Final (December 28)Series winner:''' Bane Mojićević

Notes
1.Jelena Gavrilović and Neda Ukraden performed as Chicago (the musical) together.
2.Nenad Okanović and Čipi performed "Princeza" together.
3.Katarina Bogićević and Ivan Jevtović as Andrew Lloyd Webber's opera The Phantom of the Opera performed together.
4.In the fifth week, there were two visiting members of the jury as Branko Đuric was in Australia, due to work.
5.During Katarina Bogićević's performance as Psy, presenter Bojan Ivković appeared as MC Hammer (deriving from MC Hammer's guest appearance during the American Music Award in 2012).
6.Keba and Nenad Okanović performed together as Dan Aykroyd and John Belushi in The Blues Brothers.
7.Neda Ukraden and Tanja Savić performed together singing "I'm a Believer" from the animated movie Shrek.
8.Elena Risteska and Branislav Mojićević performed "Rano je za tugu" together.
9.During Nenad Okanović's performance, presenter Bojan Ivković appeared as the second singer of Dubioza kolektiv.

References

Serbia
2014 Serbian television seasons